Daniel José Godoy Hurtado (born 13 June 1981) is a former Venezuelan football defender.

Miami United FC 

In January 2016, Godoy signed a one-year deal volunteer contract with Miami United FC as a scout and player for the team. He made his debut in the Sunshine Conference of the National Premier Soccer League (NPSL), the fourth tier of the American Soccer Pyramid, in 2017.

Miami Dade FC 

In 2015, Godoy signed as one-year deal as a volunteer with Miami Dade FC.

References

External links 
 

1984 births
Living people
People from Caracas
Association football defenders
Venezuelan footballers
Caracas FC players
Monagas S.C. players
Asociación Civil Deportivo Lara players
Deportivo Miranda F.C. players
Portuguesa F.C. players
Estudiantes de Mérida players
Venezuela international footballers
Guaros F.C. players
21st-century Venezuelan people